The men's individual recurve archery competition at the 2010 Asian Games in Guangzhou was held from 20 November to 24 November at Aoti Archery Range.

Schedule
All times are China Standard Time (UTC+08:00)

Results

Qualification round

Knockout round

Bracket

Finals

Section 1

Section 2

Section 3

Section 4

1/32 eliminations

1/16 eliminations

1/8 eliminations

1/4 eliminations

Semifinals

Bronze medal match

Gold medal match

References 
 2010 Asian Games Archery Results Book

External links 
 Official website

Men's individual